Antônio Agostinho Marochi (28 August 1925 – 28 January 2018) was a Catholic bishop.

Marochi was ordained to the priesthood in 1953. He served as auxiliary bishop of the Archdiocese of Londrina, Brazil from 1973 to 1976. He then served as bishop of the Roman Catholic Diocese of Presidente Prudente, Brazil from 1976 to 2002.

References

1925 births
2018 deaths
20th-century Roman Catholic bishops in Brazil
Roman Catholic bishops of Londrina
Roman Catholic bishops of Presidente Prudente